CBLFT-DT (channel 25) is an Ici Radio-Canada Télé station in Toronto, Ontario, Canada, which broadcasts programming to the province's Franco-Ontarian population. It is part of a twinstick with CBC Television flagship CBLT-DT (channel 5). Both stations share studios at the Canadian Broadcasting Centre on Front Street West in downtown Toronto, while CBLFT-DT's transmitter is located atop the CN Tower.

The station provides French-language programming to the Greater Toronto Area and most of Ontario, including the Southwestern, Central and Northeastern regions of the province.

History
CBLFT was originally licensed by the Canadian Radio-television and Telecommunications Commission (CRTC) in 1972 as a standalone station; the station first signed on the air on March 23, 1973. Until CBLFT signed on, CBC O&O CBLT aired French-language programming from Radio-Canada on Sunday mornings. The station originally transmitted from the CBC's Jarvis Street transmitter site, but as with almost all other radio and television stations in Toronto, approval was given by the CRTC to move the transmitter site to the CN Tower on December 14, 1973. Several transmitters in Northern Ontario which were already in operation as rebroadcasters of CBOFT in Ottawa were reassigned to CBLFT's license, and various additional rebroadcasters were added throughout Ontario in the 1970s and 1980s.

In the early 1990s due to budget cutbacks at the CBC, all Radio-Canada transmitters in Ontario (except those in the northwest part of the province, which was served by CBWFT in Winnipeg) were reassigned to the license of CBOFT as rebroadcasters. All of the transmitters that were formerly part of CBLFT's license continued to broadcast a separate local early evening newscast, which was produced in Ottawa, but was only seen in that city via a late night rebroadcast, similar to the split broadcast used at CBC Radio One station CBLA-FM (99.1 FM) for its morning programs.

On April 28, 2010, the CRTC granted a license request by the CBC to relaunch CBLFT as a separate station which would once again produce a distinct local newscast from CBOFT. Most of the network's transmitters in Ontario, except for those in the Ottawa area, were again reassigned to CBLFT's license, and newscast production later returned to Toronto.

Technical information

Subchannel

Analogue-to-digital conversion
CBLFT shut down its analogue signal, over UHF channel 25, on August 31, 2011, the official date in which Canadian television stations in CRTC-designated mandatory markets transitioned from analogue to digital broadcasts. The station's digital signal relocated from its pre-transition UHF channel 24 to post-transition (and former analogue) channel 25.

Transmitters in mandatory markets were required to switch to digital or shut down by the transition deadline of August 31, 2011. Radio-Canada requested to temporarily broadcast in analogue in these markets beyond 2011, as programming for Radio-Canada is not produced in these markets. The following CBLFT rebroadcasters are in mandatory markets:
 CBLFT-8 Kitchener
 CBLFT-9 London
 CBLFT-18 Thunder Bay
 CBEFT Windsor

However, on August 16, 2011, the CRTC granted the CBC permission to continue operating 22 repeaters in mandatory markets, including the above, in analogue until August 31, 2012, in which by then they must either convert to digital or close down. This was pending the corporation's licence renewal process, which will include an evaluation of its transition plans.

At some point before June 20, 2012, CBLFT had begun airing a Mobile DTV simulcast of CBLT-DT on PSIP channel 5-2, encoded in the H.264 and HE-AAC formats.

Transmitters
CBLFT operated almost 30 analog television rebroadcasters throughout the province of Ontario and included communities such as London, Kitchener and Sudbury. Additionally, several Radio-Canada transmitters in eastern Ontario, such as Kingston and Belleville, were part of the CBLFT license even though they served cities that were closer to Ottawa than Toronto.

Due to federal funding reductions to the CBC, in April 2012, the CBC responded with substantial budget cuts, which included shutting down CBC's and Radio-Canada's remaining analog transmitters on July 31, 2012. (A transmitter serving Barrie, CBLFT-11, closed down the previous year, in August 2011.) None of CBC or Radio-Canada's television rebroadcasters were converted to digital, leaving rural Canadians and U.S. border regions with no free over-the-air CBC/Radio-Canada coverage. Some affected viewers could get the signal back for a price by subscribing to cable or satellite.

CBLFT is not carried on cable or satellite in the United States.

In many communities, TVOntario transmitted from Radio-Canada sites and therefore permanently left the air the same day. Former rebroadcast transmitters, all now defunct, included:

References

External links
 CBLFT-DT ("ICI Ontario") official website 
 
 

BLFT-DT
BLFT-DT
Television channels and stations established in 1973
BLFT-DT
1973 establishments in Ontario